International Federation for the Promotion of Mechanism and Machine Science (IFToMM) is an organization that supports international exchange of researchers and engineers from the wide range of discipline related to Mechanical Engineering.

Mission
To promote research and development in the field of Machines and Mechanisms by theoretical and experimental methods, along with their practical application.

History
It was on September 29, 1969m at the Second World Congress on Theory of Mechanisms and Machines which took place in Zakopane (Poland), that two scientists, Ivan Artobolevski (USSR) and Erskine Crossley (USA), proposed to establish an International Federation of scientists and engineers to facilitate worldwide collaboration.
 Representatives of 13 countries signed the foundation act and the International Federation for the Theory of Machines (IFToMM) came into existence. The initial Member Organizations were represented by: 
 Academician Ivan I. Artobolevski (USSR), 
 Prof. Erskine F.R. Crossley (USA),
 Prof. Michael S. Konstantinov (Bulgaria),
 Dr. Werner Thomas (GFR),
 Prof. B.M. Belgaumkar (India),
 Prof. Kenneth H. Hunt (Australia),
 Prof. J. Oderfeld (Poland),
 Prof. Jack Phillips (Australia),
 Prof. George Rusanov (Bulgaria),
 Prof. Wolfgang Rössner (GDR),
 Prof. Zènò Terplàn (Hungary),
 Prof. Jammi S. Rao (India),
 Prof. Giovanni Bianchi (Italy),
 Prof. Adam Morecki (Poland),
 Nicolae I. Manolescu (Romania),
 Leonard Maunder (UK),
 Douglas Muster (USA),
 Ilic Branisky (Yugoslavia).

Given the expansion of the topics within the IFToMM umbrella,

 in 1999, the Executive Council decided to recognize the changing role of the organization in international collaboration and approved a new name: "The International Federation for the Promotion of Mechanism and Machine Science". However, the Executive Council considered that the abbreviation IFToMM was already widely used, and therefore suggested to keep it (along with the logo) as a short version of the organization's name.

Officers, Presidents, and General Secretaries 

IFToMM officers are the Chairs of IFToMM Member Organizations, the Chairs of Permanent Commissions and Technical Committees, as well as the members of the Executive Council. A complete historical list of IFToMM officers was published in the Proceedings of the Second International Symposium on History of Machines and Mechanisms HMM2004.

The Presidents were:
 Ivan I. Artobolevskii (USSR), 
 Leonard Maunder (United Kingdom), 
 Bernard Roth (USA), 
 Giovanni Bianchi (Italy), 
 Adam Morecki (Poland), 
 Jorge Angeles (Canada), 
 Kenneth J. Waldron (USA), 
 Marco Ceccarelli (Italy),  
 Yoshihiko Nakamura (Japan), 
 Marco Ceccarelli (Italy) (repeated),  and
 Andrés Kecskeméthy (Germany).

The Secretaries General were:
 M.S. Konstantinov (Bulgaria), 
 Emil Stanchev (Bulgaria), 
 Adam Morecki (Poland), 
 Elizabeth Filemon (Hungary), 
 Ladislav Půst (Czechoslovakia), 
 Tatu Leinonen (Finland), 
 Marco Ceccarelli (Italy),  
 Teresa Zielinska (Poland) (two terms), and
 Erwin Christian Lovasz (Romania).

Meetings
IFToMM General Assembly: every 4 years
Executive Council Meeting: an annual meeting of the members of Executive Council
IFToMM World Congress: every four years

List of all IFToMM World congresses:

Notes 
Postponed from August 18–21, 2003, due to SARS.
Decided at the IFToMM General Assembly on July 3, 2019 (Krakow, Poland).

Members
Membership in IFToMM is not individual. Instead, it is by Member Organization (MO) which are akin to national or territorial organizations.  A full list of Member Organizations available on the IFToMM web site.  Each MO has its own individual or group membership rules.

As of the 2015 General Assembly held in Taipei (Taiwan), IFToMM had 47 MOs.  In 2018, the membership went down to 45 MOs.

Organizational structure 
The organizational structure of IFToMM includes following bodies

General Assembly
The General Assembly is the supreme body of the Federation that determines policy. It is composed of the Chief Delegates of IFToMM Members and members of the Executive Council.

Executive Council
The Executive Council is responsible for managing the affairs of the Federation between the sessions of the General Assembly. The Executive Council includes the President, Vice-President, Secretary-General, Treasurer, and six ordinary members.

Commissions and Committees
There are four Permanent Commissions (PCs) and 14 Technical Committees (TCs) established under IFToMM supervision. Each Permanent Commission and Technical Committee is composed of a Chairperson, appointed by the Executive Council, and a Secretary and members, nominated by the Chairperson and appointed by the Executive Council. The general goals for the work of the Commissions and Committees are aimed at promoting their fields of interest by attracting researchers and practitioners, including young individuals.
The four PCs are:
 Permanent Commission for Communications, Publications and Archiving
 Permanent Commission for Education
 Permanent Commission for the History of Mechanism and Machine Science
 Permanent Commission for the Standardization of Terminology
While the 14 TCs are:
 Technical Committee for Biomechanical Engineering
 Technical Committee for Computational Kinematics
 Technical Committee for Engines and Powertrains
 Technical Committee for Gearing and Transmissions
 Technical Committee for Linkages and Mechanical Controls
 Technical Committee for Micromachines
 Technical Committee for Multi-body Dynamics
 Technical Committee for Reliability
 Technical Committee for Robotics and Mechatronics
 Technical Committee for Rotordynamics
 Technical Committee for Sustainable Energy Systems
 Technical Committee for Transportation Machinery
 Technical Committee for Tribology
 Technical Committee for Vibrations

See also
 Theory of Mechanisms and Machines
 Canadian Committee for the Theory of Machines and Mechanisms

References

External links 
 
The new official website https://iftomm-world.org/ replaced the old legacy website http://www.iftomm.net/ in early 2021. The legacy website is kept online for now to insure information availability.

International professional associations
Organizations established in 1969
International organisations based in Poland
Standards organisations in Poland
Engineering societies